Kosovo was a part of several international sports federations in the 1990s, and has applied to become a member of many more after its 2008 declaration of independence from Serbia.

Background 

Kosovo is a full member of the International Olympic Committee (IOC) and the European Olympic Committees (EOC); membership by the former was granted to Kosovo's Olympic Committee on 9 December 2014. The country has participated in both the Winter and Summer Olympics. At the 2016 Summer Olympics in Rio de Janeiro, Brazil, Kosovo won a gold medal, and in the 2020 Summer Olympics in Tokyo, Japan, it won two.

Prior to IOC recognition, Kosovo athletes took part in the Special Olympics from 2003. A body known as the Special Olympics Kosovo was established to provide support for paralympic athletes.

Kosovo participated in first wide multi-sport event at the 2015 European Games in Baku, Azerbaijan. Athletes from the country participated at the fourth 'World Dwarf Games' in Rambouillet, France in 2005, in the 2015 World Aquatics Championships in Kazan, Russia, and in the 2015 IHF Emerging Nations Championship, among others.

Membership in sport federations 
The following sports federations have either admitted or have received an application from Kosovo for membership:

International federations and associations membership

European federations and associations membership

See also
International recognition of Kosovo
Membership of Kosovo in international organizations
Kosovo precedent

Notes

References 

 
Independence of Kosovo